Don Eladio may refer to:
 Don Eladio Sauza, a Mexican Tequila businessman
 Don Eladio Vuente, a fictional character in Breaking Bad and Better Call Saul